Juan Carlos López Marín (born 24 April 1981) is a Colombian former road cyclist. A time trial specialist, he won the 2009 Pan American Time Trial Championships.

Major results

2003
 1st  Road race, National Under-23 Road Championships
 1st Overall Vuelta de la Juventud de Colombia
1st Stages 3 & 6 (ITT)
2004
 1st Overall Vuelta a Extremadura
2005
 2nd Overall Vuelta a Navarra
1st Mountains classification
 2nd Overall 
1st Stage 5
2007
 1st Overall 
 2nd Overall 
1st Stage 2
2008
 3rd Overall Clásico RCN
1st Stage 9 (ITT)
2009
 1st  Time trial, Pan American Road Championships
 2nd Time trial, National Road Championships
 2nd Overall 
1st Stage 2
2010
 1st Overall 
1st Stage 2 (ITT)
 1st Stage 1 (TTT) Vuelta a Colombia
2011
 3rd Time trial, National Road Championships

References

External links
 

1981 births
Living people
Colombian male cyclists
People from Rionegro
Sportspeople from Antioquia Department
21st-century Colombian people